Robert Julius Tommy Jacobsen (4 June 1912 – 26 January 1993) was a Danish sculptor and painter. The Danish Robert Award is named in his honor.

Biography
Jacobsen was born in Copenhagen. He was self-taught as a sculptor. During World War I, he worked with Danish modernist artists such as Asger Jorn, Carl-Henning Pedersen and Egill Jacobsen. They participated in the circle around the journal Helhesten and would later come to make up the COBRA-movement. Although Jacobsen had a connection with the CoBrA artists, but he never was a member of their group.

In this period he created massive granite and sandstone structures which he called "Mythical Creatures" (Danish: Fabeldyr ). In the late 1940s, he creates a group of sculptures which he called "Dolls" (Danish: Dukkerne).

He traveled to France with his colleague Richard Mortensen and lived there from 1947–69. During his time in France he began creating sculptures in cast iron. In France he received the nickname "Gros Robert" (Danish:Store Robert).

From 1962–81, he was a professor at the Academy of Fine Arts, Munich ( Kunstakademie der Bildenden Künste) in Munich. In 1969 he moved to Tågelund, west of Egtved, Denmark. From 1976 to 1985 he was professor at the Royal Danish Academy of Art, Copenhagen. From 1986 to 1991 he worked with Jean Clareboudt to create a sculpture park at Tørskind Gravel Pit near Egtved and Vejle. He also worked closely together with his son-in-law and artistic assistant, Bernard Leauté. Robert Jacobsen died in 1993, aged 80, at home in Tågelund. He was buried at Vestre Cemetery (Danish:Vestre Kirkegård) in Copenhagen.

Awards
Jacobsen was awarded the Thorvaldsen Medal in 1967. He was made an honorary member of the Association of Craftsmen in Copenhagen in 1973. In 1974 he was awarded the Prince Eugen Medal by the King of Sweden. He became a Commander of the Order of the Dannebrog in 1983.

The Robert Awards (Danish: Robert Prisen) have been awarded annually since 1984 by the Danish Film Academy. The awards are named after Robert Jacobsen who was the statuette's designer.

Since 1993, the Robert Jacobsen Prize of the Würth Foundation has been awarded to contemporary visual artists to commemorate the artist. The prize is endowed with EUR 50,000.

Artwork
Robert Jacobsen's sculptures are represented at numerous museums of modern art internationally.

Musee d'Art Wallon (Liege, Belgium)
Museo de Arte Moderna (São Paulo, Brazil)
Von der Heydt Museum (Wuppertal, Germany)
Wilhelm Hack Museum (Ludwigshafen, Germany)
Lembruck Museum (Duisburg, Germany)
Sculptors Museum (Glaskasten, Marl, Germany)
"Kunsthalle" exhibition hall Kiel (Kiel, Germany)
Neue Pinakothek, (Munich, Germany)
town gallery Lenbachhouse (Munich, Germany)
"Kunsthalle" exhibition hall Emden donation Henri Nannen (Emden, Germany)
Didrichsenin taidemuseo (Helsinki, Finland)
Musee National d'Art Modern (Paris, France)
Centre Pompidou (Paris, France)
Musee de Peinture et de Sculpture (Grenoble, France)
Musee des Beaux-Art (Rennes, France)
Fond National d'Art Contemporain (France)
Musee Rodin Paris (France)
Stedelijk Museum (Amsterdam, The Netherlands)
Kröller-Müller Museum (Otterlo, The Netherlands)
Nationalgalerie (Oslo, Norway)
Moderna Museet (Stockholm, Sweden)
Musee des Beaux-Art (La Chaux-de-Fonds, Switzerland)
Magyar Nemzeti Muzeum (Budapest, Hungary)
Museum of Art, Carnegie Institute (Pittsburgh, USA)
Hirshhorn Museum and Sculpture Garden (Washington, USA)
Fondation Herzog (New York, USA)
Carnegie Institute (Philadelphia, USA)

References

1912 births
1993 deaths
Modern sculptors
20th-century Danish painters
Artists from Copenhagen
Abstract painters
Academic staff of the Royal Danish Academy of Fine Arts
Knights of the Order of the Dannebrog
20th-century Danish sculptors
Male sculptors
Commandeurs of the Ordre des Arts et des Lettres
Danish watercolourists
Officiers of the Légion d'honneur
Recipients of the Thorvaldsen Medal
Recipients of the Prince Eugen Medal
Danish male artists
Burials at Vestre Cemetery, Copenhagen
20th-century Danish male artists